New South Wales North Coast or NSW North Coast, an interim Australian bioregion, is located in New South Wales, comprising .

Subregions
In the IBRA system it has the code of (NNC), and it has nineteen sub-regions:

References

Further reading
 Thackway, R and I D Cresswell (1995) An interim biogeographic regionalisation for Australia : a framework for setting priorities in the National Reserves System Cooperative Program Version 4.0 Canberra : Australian Nature Conservation Agency, Reserve Systems Unit, 1995. 

Biogeography of New South Wales
Eastern Australian temperate forests
IBRA regions